Wu is a hentaigana, a variant kana or Japanese syllable.

History 
It is presumed that 𛄟 would have represented . Along with 𛀆 and 𛀁 (yi and ye respectively), the syllable wu has no officially recognized kana, as these syllables do not occur in native Japanese words; however, during the Meiji period, linguists almost unanimously agreed on the kana for yi, ye, and wu. 𛀆 and wu are thought to have never occurred as syllables in Japanese, and 𛀁 was merged with え and エ.

Characters 
In the Edo period and the Meiji period, some Japanese linguists tried to separate kana u and kana wu. The shapes of characters differed with each linguist. 𛄟 and 𛄢 were just two of many shapes.

They were phonetic symbols to fill in the blanks of the gojuon table. Japanese people didn't separate them in normal writing.

u
Traditional kana
う (Hiragana)
𛀋 (Hentaigana of う. Hiragana.)
𛀍 (Hentaigana of う. Hiragana.)
ウ (Katakana)
Constructed kana
 (A part of 傴. Katakana.)

wu
Traditional kana
う (Hiragana)
𛀋 (Hentaigana of う. Hiragana.)
ウ (Katakana)
𛄢 (An old variant form of ウ. Katakana.)
Constructed kana
う〻(う with dots. Hiragana.)
𛄟 (A cursive script style of 汙. Hiragana.)
 (A cursive script style of 紆. Hiragana.)
 (A cursive script style of 迂. Hiragana,)
 (A cursive script style of 卯. Hiragana.)
ウ〻(ウ with dots. Katakana.)

These suggestions weren't accepted.

Unicode 
This kana has been encoded into Unicode 14.0 since September 14, 2021 as HIRAGANA LETTER ARCHAIC WU (U+1B11F), and KATAKANA LETTER ARCHAIC WU (U+1B122).

Notes

References

See also
Yi (kana)
Ye (kana)

Specific kana